Nurit Kedar is an Israeli producer and director of documentary films.

During the 1980s, she worked in the news department of Israel's Channel 1 in Washington. At the beginning of the 1990s, she returned to Israel, where she worked for CNN and was a senior producer for Keshet television from the time it started broadcasting on Channel 2. She produced the documentary series The Fat Man with the Sony, starring Yaron London. Together with London, she also produced for Keshet the series The Poetics of the Masses, Buddha Pizza Krishna Cola and Mr Prime Minister. Kedar produced the film Istiklal, by the director Nizar Hassan, which won the Wolgin award for best Israeli documentary at the 1994 Jerusalem Film Festival.

Kedar spoke of her film-making philosophy in a 2008 interview with Al-Jazeera: "I like conflicts, anything that has conflict, that's what I like. That's why I do wars … because that's the conflict of our lives here. Here in our society we do nothing to stop the conflict, that's who am I. I personally don't see any light at the end. I am critical and my films are not easy to watch and many of the Israeli viewers don't like it."

Kedar's film Asesino, on the disappearance and presumed murder of thousands of young Jews during the Dirty War following the 1976 Argentine coup d'état, won the Noga Award at the 2001 Jerusalem Film Festival. Her film One Shot, which included "unprecedented" interviews with Israeli snipers and footage of them at work, received the 2004 Cologne Conference Phoenix Award. Hanuszka is a 2006 film by Kedar that tells the true story of a Jewish girl who survived the Holocaust.

In extracts from Kedar's film Concrete broadcast on Britain's Channel 4 television on 26 January 2011, Israeli soldiers who took part in the 2008–09 attack on Gaza spoke of their orders, and stated that their commanders "psyched them up" and ordered "disproportionate" force. Following the broadcast, Kedar told Channel 4 News that she had received threatening messages calling her a traitor, calling for her to be expelled from Israel, and death threats. She said she had not received any messages of support from Israelis for making the film. Kedar and Yaron Shani won the Van Leer Group Foundation Award for Best Documentary Film, for the film Life Sentences at the 2013 Jerusalem Film Festival.
Life Sentences won the Objectif d'or, grand award, also the Audience Award at the  Film Festival. Won the Lifetime Achievement Award 2015 awarded by the Israeli Academy of Film and Television.
Kedar awarded "The Art Of Cinema Award". The award was given by the Israeli Ministry of Culture 2016.
"Lieber-man" Kedar's new film was selected to the Jerusalem Film Festival 2019 nominee for best documentary.

"#Schoolyard" Kedar's new film Won Special Mention Award at the Jerusalem Film Festival 2021 Israeli Documentary Competition

"#Schoolyard"  winner of 26th EDITION – PriMed 2022, MEDITERRANEAN MEMORY
sponsored by INA (Institut National de l’Audiovisuel) Marseille, France.

References 
https://jff.org.il/en

10.https://primed.tv/the-winners-of-26th-edition-primed-2022/?lang=en

External links
https://jff.org.il/en

Israeli film directors
Israeli film producers
Year of birth missing (living people)
Living people